Ante Hrkać (born 11 March 1992) is a Bosnian professional footballer who plays as a defender for Bosnian club Velež Mostar.

Club career
In the first half year of 2014, Hrkać had a spell at Austrian lower league side SVG Mayrhofen. In 2018, he signed for Saudi Arabian club Al-Qaisumah while apparently still under contract with Albanian side Teuta. He returned to hometown and his former youth club Široki Brijeg in January 2019.

On 18 August 2020, he signed a 2-year contract with Italian club Novara.

Honours
Široki Brijeg
Bosnian Cup runner-up: 2018–19

References

External links
Ante Hrkać at Sofascore

1992 births
Living people
People from Široki Brijeg
Association football defenders
Bosnia and Herzegovina footballers
NK GOŠK Gabela players
NK Vitez players
HNK Segesta players
NK Lokomotiva Zagreb players
NK Lučko players
NK Čelik Zenica players
KF Teuta Durrës players
Al-Qaisumah FC players
NK Široki Brijeg players
Novara F.C. players
FK Mladost Lučani players
FK Tuzla City players
FK Velež Mostar players
Premier League of Bosnia and Herzegovina players
First League of the Federation of Bosnia and Herzegovina players
First Football League (Croatia) players
Kategoria Superiore players
Serie C players
Serbian SuperLiga players
Bosnia and Herzegovina expatriate footballers
Expatriate footballers in Austria
Bosnia and Herzegovina expatriate sportspeople in Austria
Expatriate footballers in Croatia
Bosnia and Herzegovina expatriate sportspeople in Croatia
Expatriate footballers in Albania
Bosnia and Herzegovina expatriate sportspeople in Albania
Expatriate footballers in Saudi Arabia
Bosnia and Herzegovina expatriate sportspeople in Saudi Arabia
Expatriate footballers in Italy
Bosnia and Herzegovina expatriate sportspeople in Italy
Expatriate footballers in Serbia
Bosnia and Herzegovina expatriate sportspeople in Serbia